Tsvetan Atanasov (born 10 April 1948) was a Bulgarian football player who was deployed as a central midfield. He played for CSKA Sofia form the spring of 1966 to the 1976 having 231 match and 36 goals for the A PFG. He is champion with CSKA Sofia (1966, 1969, 1971–1973, 1975, 1976), Four times winner of the Bulgarian Cup (1969, 1972–1974) With 18 match and 3 goals for CSKA Sofia in European Tournaments. Participated in the Champions League 1/2 Final (1967) and 1/4 Final (1974). He was coach of CSKA Sofia in three matches in the spring of 1995.

External links

1948 births
Living people
Bulgarian footballers
Bulgaria international footballers
First Professional Football League (Bulgaria) players
PFC CSKA Sofia players
PFC CSKA Sofia managers
Association football midfielders
Bulgarian football managers
Sportspeople from Sofia Province